Petrusma is a surname. Notable people with the surname include:

 Jacquie Petrusma (born 1966), Australian politician
 Hank Petrusma (born 1942), Australian politician

Dutch-language surnames
Surnames of Dutch origin